Arachnomyia is a genus of flies in the family Dolichopodidae. It is known from Australia.

Species
The genus includes three species:
Arachnomyia arborum White, 1916 (Synonym: Pleuropygius longipes Parent, 1933) – Tasmania, South Australia, Victoria
Arachnomyia cuprea (Macquart, 1850) – Tasmania
Arachnomyia ornatipes Hardy, 1939 – Queensland

References

Dolichopodidae genera
Neurigoninae
Diptera of Australasia
Insects of Australia
Endemic fauna of Australia